Complement C1q tumor necrosis factor-related protein 1 is a protein that in humans is encoded by the C1QTNF1 gene.

Interactions 

C1QTNF1 has been shown to interact with Arginine vasopressin receptor 2.

References

External links

Further reading